Habib Chatty (9 August 1916 – 6 March 1991) was a Tunisian politician and diplomat. He served as the fourth Secretary-General of the Organisation of Islamic Cooperation (OIC) from 1979 to 1984.

Biography
Habi Chatty was born on 9 August 1916 in M'saken, Tunisia. He began his career as a journalist in the 1930s and became the chief editor of Assabah.

In 1955, Chatty was appointed chief information officer in prime minister Tahar Ben Ammar's government. In 1972, he became President Habib Bourguiba's chief of staff. He served as Minister of Foreign Affairs from 1974 to 1977.

In 1979, he became the fourth Secretary-General of the OIC, and held the position until 1984.

Chatty died on 6 March 1991 in Paris.

References

1916 births
1991 deaths
People from Sousse Governorate
Government ministers of Tunisia
Tunisian diplomats
Organisation of Islamic Cooperation officials
Foreign ministers of Tunisia